Nikolayevka is a rural locality (a village) in Teplyakovsky Selsoviet, Burayevsky District, Bashkortostan, Russia. The population was 4 as of 2010. There is 1 street.

Geography 
Nikolayevka is located 26 km northeast of Burayevo (the district's administrative centre) by road. Arnyashevo is the nearest rural locality.

References 

Rural localities in Burayevsky District